Young Adolf is a novel written by author Beryl Bainbridge, and first published in 1978 by Duckworth. Presented as biographical fiction, the book's main character is 23-year-old Adolf Hitler. Hitler visits relatives in Liverpool, where he gets into serious trouble with the English.

The book was adapted for television as The Journal of Bridget Hitler in 1981.

References

Novels about Adolf Hitler
1978 British novels
Novels set in Liverpool
Novels by Beryl Bainbridge
Gerald Duckworth and Company books